Chaetopappa bellioides,  called the pretty lazy daisy, or manyflower leastdaisy, is a North American species of plants in the family Asteraceae. It native to northern Mexico (Aguascalientes, Chihuahua, Coahuila, Durango, Nuevo León, San Luis Potosí, Tamaulipas, Zacatecas) and to the Rio Grande Valley in western and southern Texas.

References

External links
photo of herbarium specimen collected in Nuevo León

bellioides
Flora of Mexico
Flora of New Mexico
Flora of Texas
Plants described in 1849
Taxa named by Asa Gray